Antimitrella jaci is a species of sea snail in the family Columbellidae.

References

External links

Columbellidae
Gastropods described in 2009